Catochrysops lithargyria, the silver forget-me-not, is a small butterfly found in India that belongs to the lycaenids or blues family.

See also
List of butterflies of India
List of butterflies of India (Lycaenidae)

References
 
  
 
 
 
 

Catochrysops
Butterflies of Asia